Widescreen comics is a movement within the field of comic books named both for its very cinematic decompression style and its tendency to use panels of greater width relative to their height, mimicking the aspect ratio of widescreen cinematic presentation.

Some widescreen comics, such as the New X-Men 2001 Annual, are published horizontally with the staples at the top.

Notable writers
 Warren Ellis, The Authority, Planetary, Stormwatch
 Geoff Johns, The Flash, JSA
 Mark Millar, The Authority, The Ultimates, Wanted
 Grant Morrison, All-Star Superman, JLA, New X-Men, We3
 Joss Whedon, Astonishing X-Men
 Bryan Hitch, Hawkman

Notable artists
 John Cassaday, Astonishing X-Men, Planetary
 Bryan Hitch, The Authority, Stormwatch, The Ultimates
 Howard Porter, JLA
 Frank Quitely, All-Star Superman, The Authority, New X-Men
 Cameron Stewart, Batman and Robin, Seaguy